Helpless is a 2012 South Korean psychological mystery/thriller written and directed by Byun Young-joo based on the bestselling novel  by Japanese writer Miyabe Miyuki.

A man searches for his fiancée who vanished without a trace, only to discover dark, shocking truths about her.

Plot
South Korea, 2009. A few days before their wedding, veterinarian Jang Mun-ho (Lee Sun-kyun) and his fiancee Kang Seon-yeong (Kim Min-hee) pull over for coffee at a motorway rest stop on the way to visiting his parents in Andong, southeast of Seoul. However, when Mun-ho returns to the car, Seon-yeong has disappeared and is not reachable on her mobile phone. All he can find is a hairpin in the rest stop's toilet. From the mess at her flat in Seoul, it looks as if there has been a break-in. Mystified, Mun-ho then learns from a banker friend, Dong-woo (Kim Min-jae), that Seon-yeong had earlier applied for a bank account but had been turned down when it was discovered she had a history of personal bankruptcy dating back to 2007. Investigating her debt history, Mun-ho finds she had been using someone else's name and identity. He persuades his cousin, Kim Jong-geun (Jo Sung-ha), a former police detective sacked for taking bribes, to help find her. Examining her flat, Jong-geun finds she left no fingerprints, had no friends and claimed her mother died two years ago. It then turns out that the woman (Cha Soo-yeon) whose identity she assumed two years ago had a debt history and has since vanished. Visiting Seon-yeong's hometown, Jong-geun hears rumors she killed her mother for her insurance money. Seon-yeong's real name is, in fact, Cha Gyeong-seon, and Jong-geun and Mun-ho realize she is now looking to take on another woman's identity. They think they know her possible target.

Cast
Kim Min-hee ... Kang Seon-yeong/Cha Gyeong-seon
Lee Sun-kyun ... Jang Mun-ho 
Jo Sung-ha ... Kim Jong-geun
Kim Byul ... Han-na
Cha Soo-yeon ... the real Kang Seon-yeong
Choi Deok-moon ... Police detective Ha Seong-shik
Lee Hee-joon ... Noh Seung-ju, Gyeong-seon's ex-husband
Kim Min-jae ... Lee Dong-woo
Choi Il-hwa ... Mun-ho's father
Bae Min-hee ... Client from veterinary clinic
Im Ji-kyu ... Stalker
Kim Soo-jin ... Jong-geun's wife
 Park Hae-joon ... Loan shark
 Jin Seon-kyu ... Purser

Box office
Helpless debuted at No. 1 on the weekend box office, only three days after its premiere on March 8, attracting 607,463 moviegoers and grossing  between March 9 and 11. It topped the chart for two consecutive weeks, selling 561,666 tickets between March 16 and 18, according to KOBIS (Korean Box Office Information System). It was the twelfth most-watched Korean film of 2012, with 2,436,400 tickets sold.

Awards and nominations
2012 Baeksang Arts Awards
Best Director - Byun Young-joo 
Nomination - Best Film
Nomination - Best Actress - Kim Min-hee

2012 Buil Film Awards
Best Actress - Kim Min-hee
Nomination - Best Film
Nomination - Best Director - Byun Young-joo
Nomination - Best Supporting Actor - Jo Sung-ha

2012 Blue Dragon Film Awards
Nomination - Best Actress - Kim Min-hee
Nomination - Best Supporting Actor - Jo Sung-ha

2012 Korean Culture and Entertainment Awards
Excellence Award, Actor in a Film - Jo Sung-ha

2012 Women in Film Korea Awards
Woman Filmmaker of the Year - Byun Young-joo

References

External links 
  
 
 
 

2012 films
2010s mystery thriller films
South Korean mystery thriller films
Films set in Seoul
Films shot in Seoul
Films about identity theft
Films based on Japanese novels
Films based on mystery novels
Films based on television series
CJ Entertainment films
2010s Korean-language films
2010s South Korean films